The flag of the Hopi Nation is used by the Native American Hopi people of Arizona in the United States who live on the Hopi Reservation. The flag is a vertical tricolour of turquoise, white, and yellow, with the Hopi symbol in the middle. The flag is accompanied by a red fringe. The Hopi reservation is surrounded by the Navajo Nation.

History

In 2002, Leigh Kuwanwisiwma proposed a tribal flag. Talks about the adoption of a flag had arisen in 1993, however the current flag was only adopted in the spring of 2002. The design was printed in the tribal newspaper and comments about the flag were encouraged. The flag represents the Hopi way of life and is called the Naatoyla in Hopi.

Symbolism

Colors
The colors of the Hopi flag represent corn and the Hopi way of life.
 Turquoise (or blue) stripe (sakwa in Hopi): Natwani, all the traditional crops of the Hopi people, continuance of all life, and the duty to provide for family.
 White stripe (qöötsa): Qastiyayngwani, purity in life and balance at the time of creation.
 Yellow stripe (sikyangpu): Sitala, many flowers, for when plant life is rejuvenated, the land is blessed with renewed spirits.

Hopi symbol
The Tuuwaqatsi or earth symbol is the main symbol of the Hopi people. Says Donald Healy in his book "Native American Flags":

See also
 Colorado River Indian Reservation
 Flag of the United States
 Flag of Arizona
 Flag of New Mexico
 Navajo Nation Flag

References

Hopi
Hopi Reservation
Hopi
Hopi
Hopi